Al-Andalus is an area of Farwaniya Governorate in Kuwait City, Kuwait.

History
It was named after the historical Muslim territory al-Andalus. The region was established in 1970. Its population in 2020 was 50,773.

References

Districts of Al Farwaniyah Governorate
Populated places in Kuwait